Bruce L. Cohen (born September 23, 1961) is a film, television, and theater producer.

Biography
Cohen was born to a Jewish family and raised in Falls Church, Virginia. In 1983, he graduated from Yale University with a Bachelor of Arts in Film Studies. After school, he moved to Los Angeles where he accepted a clerical job as a Directors Guild of America trainee on Steven Spielberg's The Color Purple, and went on to serve as associate producer and first assistant director on Spielberg's Hook. Cohen won the Academy Award for Best Picture for producing American Beauty. He earned additional Best Picture nominations for Milk and Silver Linings Playbook. American Beauty, directed by Sam Mendes, won a total of five Oscars, as well as the Golden Globe, British Academy of Film and Television (BAFTA), and Producers Guild of America (PGA) awards. Milk, directed by Gus Van Sant, was nominated for eight Academy Awards and won Oscars for Best Actor and Best Original Screenplay, as well as the PGA's Stanley Kramer Award. Silver Linings Playbook, written and directed by David O. Russell, was nominated for eight Oscars. It was the first film in 31 years to be nominated in all four acting categories, and Jennifer Lawrence won the Oscar in the Best Actress category.

Among the other films Cohen has produced is Big Fish, directed by Tim Burton, which was both a Golden Globe and BAFTA nominee for Best Picture. He is currently a lead producer of the stage musical version of Big Fish, now on Broadway at the Neil Simon Theatre, with direction and choreography by five-time Tony winner Susan Stroman.

In television, Cohen was executive producer of the ABC series Pushing Daisies, which won a total of seven Emmys and was nominated for a Golden Globe as Best Comedy. He was also executive producer of the CBS special Movies Rock, and was nominated for an Emmy in 2011 for producing the 83rd Annual Academy Awards.

Cohen is on the Board of Governors of the Producer's Guild, having served two terms as vice president of motion pictures, and is on the Executive Committee of the Producer's Branch of the Academy of Motion Picture Arts and Sciences. He is president of the board of directors of the American Foundation for Equal Rights, the group behind the recently successful Supreme Court case to have California's Proposition 8 declared unconstitutional.

In 2019, Bruce Cohen joined the Advisory Board for the Harlem Film House, which presents the Hip Hop Film Festival, an annual event that focuses on filmmakers from the global culture of hip hop and also promotes  financial sustainability for independent filmmakers from marginalized or economically disadvantaged communities.

He is married to Gabriel Catone and they have a daughter.

Filmography
He was a producer in all films unless otherwise noted.

Film

Second unit director or assistant director

As an actor

Thanks

Television

Miscellaneous crew

References

External links
 

Film producers from Virginia
20th-century American Jews
American entertainment industry businesspeople
LGBT Jews
LGBT people from Virginia
LGBT film producers
LGBT television producers
LGBT theatre managers and producers
Producers who won the Best Picture Academy Award
HuffPost writers and columnists
Yale University alumni
Living people
People from Falls Church, Virginia
1961 births
Golden Globe Award-winning producers
Filmmakers who won the Best Film BAFTA Award
21st-century American Jews